The 1914–15 Gold Cup was the 3rd edition of the Gold Cup, a cup competition in Irish football.

The tournament was won by Shelbourne for the first time, defeating Linfield 1–0 in the final at Solitude.

Results

Quarter-finals

|}

Replay

|}

Semi-finals

|}

Final

References

1914–15 in Irish association football